Chandlersville is an unincorporated community in western Salt Creek Township, Muskingum County, Ohio, United States.  It has a post office with the ZIP code 43727.  It lies along State Route 146 at its intersection with State Routes 284 and 313.

History
Chandlersville was laid out in 1842. A post office called Chandlersville has been in operation since 1843. The community was named for Captain John Chandler, a pioneer settler. Besides the post office, Chandlersville had several stores and a sawmill.

References

Unincorporated communities in Ohio
Unincorporated communities in Muskingum County, Ohio
1842 establishments in Ohio
Populated places established in 1842